Flying Scot was a marque used by Scottish and then an English bicycle manufacturer 

The Flying Scot bikes were first built in 1901 by David Rattray and Co. in Glasgow. Rattray was probably the largest maker of lightweight bicycles in Scotland.  Rattray went out of business in 1982.  

In 1982, Dave Yates at M. Steel Cycles in England purchased the "Flying Scot" name.  M Steel built bikes under this name until 1991.  The M. Steel bikes are labeled "Flying Scot" whereas the Rattray bicycles were "The Flying Scot".

External links
National Museum of Scotland article
Flying Scot History

Defunct cycle manufacturers of Scotland
Companies based in Glasgow
British companies established in 1901
Vehicle manufacturing companies established in 1901
Vehicle manufacturing companies disestablished in 1982
1901 establishments in Scotland
1982 disestablishments in Scotland
British companies disestablished in 1982